The men's pétanque doubles event in boules sports at the 2009 World Games took place from 20 to 22 July 2009 at the 228 Memorial Park in Kaohsiung, Taiwan.

Competition format
A total of 6 teams entered the competition. In preliminary round they played round-robin tournament. From this stage the best four pairs advanced to the semifinals.

Results

Preliminary

Finals

References

External links
 Results on IWGA website

Boules sports at the 2009 World Games